Tunca (Laz language: Dutxe) is a town (belde) in the Ardeşen District, Rize Province, Turkey. Its population is 4,237 (2021). Dutxe is famous for Formulaz festival.

History 
According to list of villages in Laz language book (2009), name of the village is Dutxa or Dutxe, which is derived from dudi-xa, which means "upper place". Most villagers are ethnically Laz.

References

Populated places in Ardeşen District
Laz settlements in Turkey